Daylife offered cloud publishing tools for web publishers, marketers, and developers. It provided digital media management tools and content feeds to publishers, brand marketers, and developers. Daylife was founded in 2006 and has raised $15M investment to date, most recently from strategic investor Getty Images. The company is headquartered in downtown New York City.

Daylife's products include the Daylife Publisher Suite, a range of APIs, and a set of "hosted solutions" including Smart Topics, Smart Galleries, and Smart Sections. The hosted solutions were all launched in partnership with Getty Images, and they allow publishers to source, manage and compose sites, media components, pages, and complete sections of content.  Daylife's technology analyzes over 100,000 curated content feeds and allows publishers to curate and automate media to enhance proprietary content.

Clients include USA Today, Bloomberg Businessweek, NPR,  Mashable, Sky News, Forbes, Thomson Reuters, and over 80 others.

The company seems to have shut down after 2016.

Publisher Suite
The Daylife Publisher Suite allows publishers and marketers to deploy on-demand media features and apps from the cloud onto any digital channel with a few clicks. All the features and apps are managed from a simple browser-based dashboard.

Smart Galleries
SmartGalleries is a suite of tools that allow publishers to create image galleries as customizable widgets or in full-page formats. Publishers can hand-select images or automatically fill galleries based on keywords. Daylife and Getty Images launched SmartGalleries in September 2009 in conjunction with their investment announcement.

Smart Topics
SmartTopics are tools for publishers to create media-rich pages on specific topics, linking to proprietary content and related media such as videos, images, links and tweets, selected by the publisher.

Smart Sections
SmartSections are tools that allow publishers to compose and launch full content sections on verticals like Travel or Basketball, featuring real-time media from proprietary and outside sources selected by the editor.

Daylife APIs
Daylife's Developer APIs are a programming platform for media. They are highly flexible and scalable, serving over 1.5 billion calls per month as of July 2011.

These APIS let developers source, combine, and synthesize news and media content into applications. The APIs ingest, parse, and analyze media content, exposing hundreds of ways to query it and then deliver it at scale. Both free and paid access is available.

An example of the semantic web, Daylife analyzes a continuous stream of media content, maps, connections between news topics, and enables dynamic news navigation by topic, country, journalist, medium, timeline, and geography.

History
Daylife was founded in 2006 by Chief Executive Officer Upendra Shardanand. The company released its APIs in 2008. In 2009, Daylife was named one of the "Top 50 Tech Startups" by BusinessWeek and "Top 50 Real-Time Web Companies" by ReadWriteWeb. Daylife is funded by Balderton Capital, Arts Alliance, The New York Times, and Getty Images. Angel investors include Michael Arrington, John Borthwick, Andrew Rasiej, and Dave Winer. Jeff Jarvis is a partner at Daylife. In 2012, Daylife was acquired by NewsCred.

References

External links
Daylife, Getty Give Aggregation Tools to Publishers (for a Price)
Daylife, the Aggregator That Newspapers Like
Digital Media Companies That Hearst Could Buy Tomorrow
Top 50 Real-Time Web Companies
Daylife

Web services
Internet properties established in 2007